Picaresque may refer to:

 Picaresque novel, popular subgenre of prose fiction
 Picaresque (album), 2005 album by American rock band The Decemberists